Stadion Lechii may refer to:

 Stadion Energa Gdańsk
 Gdańsk Sports Center Stadium